Cleopatra Madonna Higgins, better known as Cleo Higgins, is a British R&B/soul/pop singer, dancer and songwriter based in Manchester, England. Higgins is the lead singer of the eponymously named sister girl group, Cleopatra.

Music career

Early career
In 2000, Higgins branched out from Cleopatra and recorded two duets with tenor Russell Watson.  The first song, "Someone Like You" was featured on Watson's multi-platinum debut album The Voice, which climbed to No. 1 on the U.S. classical charts.  Higgins and Watson performed the song both on tour and on the National Lottery and they collaborated a second time, recording another duet called "The Best That Love Can Be" for Watson's third album, Reprise. 

In 2001, Higgins headlined the Young Voices in Concert tour, performing at the Manchester Arena in front of 15,000 people as she and almost 7,000 choir members set a new  Guinness World Record for the largest choir assembled in the UK. The performance was aired on the BBC's long-standing programme Songs of Praise. In 2002 Higgins participated in ITV1's Songs of Bond, a tribute to the songs of James Bond, where she covered "For Your Eyes Only".  

In 2007 Higgins released her pilot solo single "Feelin' Like This".

2013: The Voice UK
In 2013, Higgins auditioned for The Voice UK and her Blind Audition was shown in April 2013. All of the coaches turned around and she chose Will.i.am's team. In the Battle round, Will.i.am kept Higgins over duo Nu-tarna. In the Knockout round Will.i.am then kept Higgins over both Lem and John.  Higgins competed in the quarter-finals against both Leah and Leanne with Will.i.am giving Leah his fast pass while Higgins was voted through by the public. 

During the course of the show, there were rumours that Will.i.am did not enjoy working with her, which were immediately rebutted by her. Higgins was eliminated at the semi-final stage when she performed against Leah McFall for the public vote. Will.i.am used the opportunity to dispel rumours  of a rift, telling Higgins live on television, "You are an amazing artist.  I would love to work with you".
Performances

Tours and later performances 
Higgins has toured with Joe Budden, Russell Watson, Jagged Edge, Blue, and Girls Aloud, and covered Kym Sims' "Too Blind To See It".  

In February 2023 Higgins led "The Aretha Franklin Story", performed with other Night Owl Productions musicians and singers at the Regal Theatre, Adelaide, Australia, as part of the Adelaide Fringe.

Other activities 
Higgins has also worked as a brand ambassador for CoverGirl.

Discography

Singles

References

External links
 

1982 births
Living people
21st-century Black British women singers
British contemporary R&B singers
English soul singers
Musicians from Birmingham, West Midlands
The Voice UK contestants
English people of Sierra Leonean descent
English women pop singers